Walter John "Jack" Hawkins (born May 5, 1932) is an author and former politician in Nova Scotia, Canada. He represented Hants East in the Nova Scotia House of Assembly from 1970 to 1978, from 1981 to 1984 and from 1988 to 1993 as a Liberal member.

He was born in Halifax, Nova Scotia and educated at Saint Mary's University and the University of New Brunswick. He served in the Canadian Army from 1955 to 1960, reaching the rank of lieutenant. Hawkins was an English professor at the Nova Scotia Agricultural College and St. Mary's University. He served in the province's Executive Council as Minister of Agriculture from 1972 to 1978 and as Minister of the Environment from 1975 to 1976. Hawkins also served as chair of the Nova Scotia Treasury Board from 1975 to 1978 and Chair of the Liberal caucus from 1981 to 1983.

He was the author of:
 Life and Times of Angus L. Macdonald (1969)
 Deer Hunting in Eastern Canada (1981) 
 Recollections of the Regan Years: a Political Memoir (1990) 
 Renfrew Gold: the Story of a Nova Scotia Ghost Town (1995) 
 Maitland, The Ships, The Men, and Their Wealth (1996)
 The Founding of Halifax (1999)

References 

 Entry from Canadian Who's Who

1932 births
20th-century Canadian historians
Canadian male non-fiction writers
Living people
Nova Scotia Liberal Party MLAs
Writers from Halifax, Nova Scotia
Saint Mary's University (Halifax) alumni
University of New Brunswick alumni